Gharqab (also Romanized as Gharqāb and Gharqeb; also known as Gharghab and Qarqāb) is a village in Kenarrudkhaneh Rural District, in the Central District of Golpayegan County, Isfahan Province, Iran. At the 2006 census, its population was 50, in 20 families.

References 

Populated places in Golpayegan County